Swamy is a 2005 Indian Kannada-language romantic action film directed and co-written by M. S. Ramesh and produced by Bharathi Basavaraju. The main cast includes Darshan, Gayatri Jayaraman and Avinash besides Jai Jagadish and Rangayana Raghu in other pivotal roles.

The film was released on 30 September 2005 across Karnataka cinema halls and received a mixed response from critics and audiences. The critics mentioned that the story line draws parallels from Tamil films such as Saamy and Anjaneya.

Cast
 Darshan as Narayana Swamy
 Gayatri Jayaraman as Aishwarya
 Avinash as Aravinda Desai
 Jai Jagadish  as Police Commissioner
 Rangayana Raghu as Police Constable
 Sadhu Kokila
 Ashok
 Nagashekar
 Sriraksha
 Shobharaj as Paramashiva

Soundtrack
The music of the film was composed by Gurukiran.

References

External source

 2005 year roundup
 MusicIndiaonline - Swamy soundtrack

2005 films
2000s Kannada-language films
2000s masala films
Indian action films
Films scored by Gurukiran
2005 action films